Miradolo Terme (Western Lombard: Miradò) is a comune (municipality) in the Province of Pavia in the Italian region Lombardy, located about 45 km southeast of Milan and about 25 km east of Pavia. 

Miradolo Terme borders the following municipalities: Chignolo Po, Graffignana, Inverno e Monteleone, San Colombano al Lambro, Sant'Angelo Lodigiano, Santa Cristina e Bissone.

References

Cities and towns in Lombardy
Spa towns in Italy